Super Duty Tough Work are a Canadian art-rap/hip hop group from Winnipeg, Manitoba. They are most noted for their 2019 EP Studies in Grey, which was longlisted for the 2020 Polaris Music Prize.

The project is led by Brendan Kinley, who performs under the stage name Brendan Grey, fronting an eight-piece band of both local and international musicians whose music uses live instruments to recreate the sound and feel of classic hip hop production tools, such as the MPC2000 or Roland SP404.

In addition to their Polaris Prize nomination, the band were nominated for Best Rap/Hip Hop Group at the Western Canadian Music Awards in 2020.

References

Canadian hip hop groups
Canadian jazz ensembles
Musical groups from Winnipeg
Black Canadian musical groups